Biglow is a surname. Notable people with the surname include:

Abe L. Biglow (1872–1923), American politician and businessman
John Biglow (born 1957), American rower
Lucius Horatio Biglow (1885–1961), American football player and coach

See also
Bigelow (surname)